Leon Clifton is a fictional detective, a protagonist of numerous Czech language detective stories of early 20th century. He is a brilliant American detective, master of disguise, capable to solve any mystery.

Publications and authorship
The stories, presented as authentic memoirs of an American detective translated from English, were initially published by Rudolf Storch (publisher) in Czechoslovakia during 1906-1911, 275 stories in total. Later publications (by other editors) were mostly either re-editions, or revised editions. These stories represented a phenomenon of Czech literature and were commonly known as cliftonky ("cliftonians", "Clifton tales"; singular: cliftonka). The authorship of the stories is not well attested. The authorship was established only after Šťastný's death when his widow started pursuing the copyrights. Another probable author was  Czech actor and comedy and play writer .

Influence
Other authors were inspired by cliftonky as well. For example, in 1925 Slovak writer  published  "Nejposlednější dobrodružství Leona Cliftona" [The Last Adventure of Leon Clifton]. Jiří Voskovec and Jan Werich produced a parody play "Gorila ex machina čili Leon Clifton čili Tajemství Cliftonova kladívka", premiered in 1928. During 1991-1994, Jaroslav Velinský, after writing over 30 stories about a (fictional) detective Ota Fink, tried to resurrect Clifton and published 5 cliftonky, with little success.

Some of the best cliftonky were recorded by Czech Radio.

Czech author Jaroslav Foglar in his childhood used to read cliftonky much and even copy them for sale, earning 20 heller per copy. This initially affected his literary style, and some of the first editions of his books were to be corrected later, to get rid of the literary slag.

Literary criticism
Cliftonky were a popular leisure reading of low literary value (paraliterature, pulp fiction).

A notable feature of cliftonky was an accent on the final punishment of "bad guys".

 in his  brings an attention to fantastic elements in some cliftonky.

References

External links
, a Clifton story
 Leon Clifton search results in the digital library  of the National Library of the Czech Republic
 Michal Jareš, CLIFTONOVO STOLETÍ [The Century of Clifton], a M.S. thesis, 2018. Contains an annotated bibliography of available sources on the subject
 Z pamětí amerického detektiva Léona Cliftona, 2018, . Contains 50 cliftonky, as well as a fictional biography of Léon Clifton.
, detektivka: Léon Clifton se vrací, a book preface
Digitalizovaný český brak: Americký detektiv i erotika u moře [Digitized Czech junk literature: American detective and erotica by the sea], CT24, July 25, 2013. A report about the Digital Archive of Popular Literature, with an emphasis on cliftonky

Fictional detectives
Czech fiction
Americana in the Czech Republic
Characters in pulp fiction
Fictional American people